PAK3 (p21-activated kinase 2, beta-PAK) is one of three members of Group I PAK family of evolutionary conserved serine/threonine kinases. PAK3 is preferentially expressed in neuronal cells  and involved in synapse formation and plasticity and mental retardation.

Discovery 
PAK3 was initially cloned from a murine fibroblast cDNA library and from a murine embryo cDNA library. Like other group I PAKs, PAK3 is stimulated by activated Cdc42 and Rac1.

Gene and spliced variants 
The human PAK3 gene, the longest group I family member, is 283-kb long. The PAK3 gene is composed of 22 exons of which 6 exons are for 5’-UTR and generates 13 alternative spliced transcripts. Among PAK3 transcripts, 11 transcripts are for coding proteins ranging from 181- to 580-amino acids long, while remaining two transcripts are non-coding RNAs. The murine PAK3 gene contains 10 transcripts, coding six proteins from 544 amino acids and 559 amino acids long, and four smaller polypeptides from 23 to 366 amino acids.

Protein domains 
Similar to PAK1, PAK2 contains a p21-binding domain (PBD) and an auto-inhibitory domain (AID) and exists in an inactive conformation.

Activators and inhibitors 
PAK3 activity is stimulated by Dbl, Cdc42 and Cool-2, and by AP1 transcription factor. Stimulation of PAK3 activity by upstream stimulators such as Dbl or Cdc42 is inhibited by p50 (Cool-1) PAK3 activity is inhibited by FRAX597, a PAN inhibitor of PAKs.

Functions 
PAK3 is overexpressed in neuroendocrine/carcinoids tumors. PAK3 has been shown to be important for synapse formation and plasticity, and contribute to mental retardation. Further, every mutations in the PAK3 gene have been associated with nonsyndromic X-linked mental retardation.

Notes

References

External links